Kogileswaran Raj a/l Mohana Raj (born 21 September 1998) is a Malaysian professional footballer who plays as an winger or attacking midfielder for K League 2 club Chungbuk Cheongju and the Malaysia national team.

Club Career

Sri Pahang
On 1 January 2016, Kogi signed for a Malaysia Super League side Sri Pahang FC from Harimau Muda C on a free transfer.

Under the management of Dollah Salleh, he made 27 appearances for the club and scored 3 goals for Sri Pahang FC from 2016 until 2019.

Petaling Jaya City
On 1 January 2020, Kogi joined a fellow Malaysia Super League side Petaling Jaya City FC. From 2020 until 2022 season,  he made 46 appearances for the club and scored 8 goals for Petaling Jaya City FC.

Chungbuk Cheongju
On 10 January 2023, Kogileswaran signed a one-year contract with K League 2 side Chungbuk Cheongju and become first Malaysian to play in K-League .

International career

Malaysia U-16
On August 2013, Kogi was enlisted in Malaysia U-16 squad for the 2013 AFF U-16 Youth Championship. He made 6 appearances and scored 2 goals for Malaysia U16. Both of the goals scored against Philippines U16. Malaysia ended up being the champion of 2013 AFF U-16 Youth Championship.

From 2013 until 2014, Kogileswaran played for Malaysia U16 squad. Under the management of S. Balachandran, He made 10 appearances and scored 2 goals for  Malaysia U16.

Malaysia U-19
From 2015 until 2016, Kogileswaran played for Malaysia U19 squad. Under the management of Frank Bernhardt, he got selected for the squad. In those years, he made 5 appearances and didn't scored any goal for Malaysia U19.

Malaysia U-23
On 23 November 2017, Kogi was enlisted in Malaysia U22's 30-man provisional squad for the 2018 AFC U-23 Championship. On 10 January 2018, he made his first appearance for the Malaysia U23, coming from the bench in the 72nd minute in a 1–4 defeat to Iraq at Changshu Stadium.

On November 2020, Kogi was enlisted in Malaysia U-23 squad for the 2019 Southeast Asian Games. He made 4 appearances and scored 2 goals for Malaysia U23.
One is against Singapore and one against Indonesia. Malaysia U23 ended their campaign on 4th placed in the group stage.

Malaysia
On 27 March 2018, Kogi made his first Malaysia senior team debut against Lebanon in 2019 AFC Asian Cup qualification. He made his team debut after got subs in 89th minutes. He scored his first goal for Malaysia in a 1-3 win against Cambodia in 2020 AFF Championship group stage.

Career statistics

Club

Notes

International

Honours
Sri Pahang
Malaysia FA Cup: 2018

Malaysia U-16
 AFF U-16 Youth Championship: 2013

References

External links
 

1998 births
Living people
Malaysian footballers
Sri Pahang FC players
Petaling Jaya City FC players
Malaysia Super League players
K League 2 players
Sportspeople from Kuala Lumpur
Malaysian people of Tamil descent
Malaysian sportspeople of Indian descent
Association football forwards
Association football midfielders
Footballers at the 2018 Asian Games
Asian Games competitors for Malaysia
Competitors at the 2019 Southeast Asian Games
Malaysia international footballers
Malaysia youth international footballers
Southeast Asian Games competitors for Malaysia
Expatriate footballers in South Korea